The Derencsényi was a Hungarian noble family from the 14th century to the end of the 16th century.

Origins
The Derencsényi family belonged to the Balog, a clan of Hungarian nobles, which traced its descent to a German knight, Altmann von Friedberg who immigrated into Hungary during the second reign of King Peter (1044–1046).

The first member of the family was Peter Derencsényi ("of Derencsény"), Vice-voivode of Transylvania who obtained the lordship of Derencsény, Gömör County (today: Drienčany, Slovakia). The Derencsényis also possessed Eszterény (today part of Hrušovo) and Laponya.

Paul Derencsényi lost Derencsény and Kápolna because of his tyrannical behavior in 1544. The related House of Szécsi (Széchy) acquired those lands. The last member of the family was Stephen in the end of the 16th century.

Notable members of the family
 Nicholas Derencsényi (c. 1354 – c. 1380): Count of the Székelys (1377–1380)
 Emeric Derencsényi (c. 1394 – c. 1434): Ispán (Count; comes) of Gömör County
 Emeric Derencsényi (? – 11 September 1493): Ban of Croatia and Dalmatia, Ban of Slavonia (1493), killed in the Battle of Krbava Field

See also
List of titled noble families in the Kingdom of Hungary

References

External links 
 
 Engel, Pál (1996). Magyarország világi archontológiája, 1301–1457, I. ("Secular Archontology of the Kingdom of Hungary, 1301–1457, Volume I."). História, MTA Történettudományi Intézete. Budapest. .